Communications in the United States include extensive industries and distribution networks in print and telecommunication. The primary telecom regulator of communications in the United States is the Federal Communications Commission.

History 

American inventors and entrepreneurs made substantial  contributions to development and commercialization of the radio, telephone, and television. The Internet protocol suite was developed with U.S. government funding.

Regulation 

The Federal Communications Commission (FCC) is an independent government agency responsible for regulating the radio, television and phone industries. The FCC regulates all interstate communications, such as wire, satellite and cable, and international communications originating or terminating in the United States.

Significant laws in the history of U.S. telecommunications include:
 Wireless Ship Act of 1910, the first radio regulations
 Mann–Elkins Act of 1910, granting the Interstate Commerce Commission the power to regulate telephones, telegraphs, and wireless telegraphs
 Radio Act of 1912, the first to require radio licenses
 Radio Act of 1927, which created the Federal Radio Commission
 Communications Act of 1934, creating the FCC and moving phone and radio regulation there
 All-Channel Receiver Act (1962), requiring that televisions include UHF and not just VHF receivers
 Public Broadcasting Act of 1967, establishing the Corporation for Public Broadcasting, which funded the creation of PBS and NPR
 Cable Television Consumer Protection and Competition Act of 1992, requiring carriage of local broadcast channels free of charge
 Cable Communications Policy Act of 1984, which gave municipalities the power to grant cable television monopolies
 Satellite Home Viewer Act (US) (1988)
 Communications Assistance for Law Enforcement Act, which required telecom providers assist the government in authorized wiretapping
 Telecommunications Act of 1996, including the Communications Decency Act
 Children's Online Privacy Protection Act (1998)
 Digital Millennium Copyright Act (1998)
 Wireless Communications and Public Safety Act (1999), updating regulations for 9-1-1

Several laws relate to unsolicited commercial communications:
 Telephone Consumer Protection Act of 1991
 CAN-SPAM Act of 2003
 Junk Fax Prevention Act of 2005
 Truth in Caller ID Act of 2009

The FCC fairness doctrine regulation was in place from 1949 to 1987.

Press 

Newspapers declined in their influence and penetration into American households in the late 20th century.  Most newspapers are local, having little circulation outside their particular metropolitan area.  The closest thing to a national paper the U.S. has is USA Today.  Other influential dailies include The New York Times, The Washington Post and The Wall Street Journal which are sold in most U.S. cities.

The largest newspapers (by circulation) in the United States are USA Today, The Wall Street Journal, The New York Times and the Los Angeles Times.

Mail 
The legal monopoly of the government-owned United States Postal Service has narrowed during the 20th and 21st centuries due to competition from companies such as UPS & FedEx, although still delivers the vast majority of US mail.

Telephone 
In 1890, 1 percent of U.S. households owned at least one telephone while a majority did by 1946 and 75 percent did by 1957.

Telephone system:
General assessment: A large, technologically advanced, multipurpose communications system.
Domestic: A large system of fiber-optic cable, microwave radio relay, coaxial cable, and domestic satellites carries every form of telephone traffic; a rapidly growing cellular system carries mobile telephone traffic throughout the country.
International: Country code - 1; 24 ocean cable systems in use; satellite earth stations - 61 Intelsat (45 Atlantic Ocean and 16 Pacific Ocean), 5 Intersputnik (Atlantic Ocean region), and 4 Inmarsat (Pacific and Atlantic Ocean regions) (2000).

Landlines 
Telephones - main lines in use: 141 million (2009)

 Most of the American telephone system was formerly operated by a single monopoly, AT&T, which was divided in 1984 into a long-distance telephone company and seven regional "Baby Bells".
 Landline telephone service continues to be divided between incumbent local exchange carriers and several competing long-distance companies. As of 2005, some of the Baby Bells are beginning to merge with long-distance phone companies. A small number of consumers are currently experimenting with Voice over Internet Protocol phone service.
 Most local loop service to homes is provided through old-fashioned copper wire, although many of the providers have upgraded the so-called "last mile" to fiber optic.
 Early in the 21st century the number of wire lines in use stopped growing and in some markets began to decline.

Cellular/Wireless communication 

Telephones - mobile cellular: 286 million (2009)
 Most states have several competing cellular phone networks.
 The major cellphone companies in the U.S. are Verizon Wireless, AT&T Mobility, and T-Mobile US.

Radio 

In 1923, 1 percent of U.S. households owned at least one radio receiver while a majority did by 1931 and 75 percent did by 1937.

Radio broadcast stations: AM: 4,669; FM commercial stations: 6,746; FM educational stations: 4,101; FM translators & boosters: 7,253; low-power FM stations: 1,678 (as of December 31, 2016, according to the Federal Communications Commission)

 Most broadcast stations are controlled by large media conglomerates like iHeartMedia. There are also many small independent local stations. National Public Radio (NPR) is the public radio network.

Radios: 575 million (1997)

Television 

In 1948, 1 percent of U.S. households owned at least one television while 75 percent did by 1955, and by 1992, 60 percent of all U.S. households received cable television subscriptions. In 1980, 1 percent of U.S. households owned at least one videocassette recorder while 75 percent did by 1992.

Television broadcast stations: 7,533 (of which 1,778 are full-power TV stations; 417 are class-A TV stations; 3,789 are TV translators; and 1,966 are other low-power TV stations) (as of December 31, 2016, according to the Federal Communications Commission); in addition, there are about 12,000 cable TV systems.

 Most local commercial television stations are owned-and-operated by or affiliated with the large national broadcast networks such as the American Broadcasting Company (ABC), CBS, the Fox Broadcasting Company (Fox), the National Broadcasting Company (NBC), and The CW Television Network. Some television networks are aimed at ethnic minorities, including Spanish-language networks Univisión and Telemundo. The Public Broadcasting Service (PBS) is the country's main public broadcasting network, with over 300 non-profit affiliated stations across the United States. Besides the large broadcast networks (which are free for anyone with a TV and an antenna), there are also many networks available only with a subscription to cable or satellite television, like CNN.

Televisions: 219 million (1997)

Internet 

Internet Service Providers (ISPs): 7,600 (1999 est.)

 Because of aggressive lobbying and the United States' strong libertarian traditions, the Internet service provider industry remains relatively unregulated in comparison to other communications industries.

Country code (Top level domain): US

 For various historical reasons, the .us domain was never widely used outside of a small number of government agencies and school districts.  Most companies signed up for top level domains like .com instead.
 NeuStar Inc. now has control over the .us registry and is trying to promote the domain as an option for American-oriented Web sites.

See also 

 Big Three television networks
 Cable television in the United States
 Communications in the United States
 Fourth television network
 High-definition television in the United States
 List of television stations in the United States
 List of United States cable and satellite television networks
 List of United States over-the-air television networks
 List of United States television markets
 Satellite television in the United States
 Television in the United States
 Television news in the United States
 United States cable news

References